Earwig is the second studio album by the punk rock band Pegboy. It was released in 1994 through Quarterstick Records.

Critical reception
The Daily Times wrote that "Pegboy's combination of classic punk structure with John Haggerty's furious guitar work makes it a band to be reckoned with and marks Earwig as one of the fall's best releases." The Chicago Tribune wrote that the band "pours in some of the feel of Seam in lead singer Larry Damore's wistful lyrics, hardened behind a big three-chord grind from ex-Naked Raygun guitarist John Haggerty." Trouser Press called the album "respectable if hardly revelatory," writing that "the pleasure comes in hearing the Haggerty brothers interact; John sounds like he’s trying to drill holes in the wall of the percussion Joe throws up on 'Gordo.'" The Washington Post wrote that "some of the tracks tend to blur, but ones like 'You' and 'Blister' achieve a potent merger of pop and wallop."

Track listing

Personnel 
Pegboy
Larry Damore – vocals
Joe Haggerty – drums
John Haggerty – guitar
Pierre Kezdy – bass guitar
Production and additional personnel
Iain Burgess – production, engineering
Peter Deimel – engineering
Frank Marte – art directions, design

References

External links 
 

1994 albums
Albums produced by Iain Burgess
Pegboy albums
Quarterstick Records albums